Uno Wallentin (April 15, 1905 – October 8, 1954) was a Swedish sailor who competed in the 1936 Summer Olympics. In 1936 he was a crew member of the Swedish boat Sunshine which won the silver medal in the Star class.

References

External links
profile

1905 births
1954 deaths
Swedish male sailors (sport)
Olympic sailors of Sweden
Sailors at the 1936 Summer Olympics – Star
Olympic silver medalists for Sweden
Olympic medalists in sailing
Medalists at the 1936 Summer Olympics